Michele Cipolla (28 October 1880, Palermo – 7 September 1947, Palermo) was an Italian mathematician, mainly specializing in number theory.

He was a professor of Algebraic Analysis at the University of Catania and, later, the University of Palermo. He developed (among other things) a theory for sequences of sets and Cipolla's algorithm for finding square roots modulo a prime number. He also solved the problem of binomial congruence.

Publications
Opere (Hrsg.: Guido Zappa)  Sede della Soc., Palermo 1997. XXXII, 547 S. : Ill. (Supplemento ai Rendiconti del Circolo Matematico di Palermo ; Ser. 2, No. 47)
Storia della matematica dai primordi a Leibniz. Soc. Ed. Siciliana, Mazara 1949. 174 S.

Literature
Michele Cipolla (1880–1947): la figura e l'opera ; convegno celebrativo nel cinquantenario della morte (Palermo, 8 settembre 1997) / / Associazione degli Insegnanti e dei Cultori di Matematica. - Palermo 1998. 156 S.

See also
 Cipolla's algorithm: Method for taking the modular square root for a prime modulus

External links
 

19th-century Italian mathematicians
20th-century Italian mathematicians
1880 births
1947 deaths
Academic staff of the University of Palermo
Scientists from Palermo
Mathematicians from Sicily